Events in the year 1982 in Portugal.

Incumbents
President: António Ramalho Eanes
Prime Minister: Francisco Pinto Balsemão

Events
 12 December - Local election.

Arts and entertainment
Portugal participated in the Eurovision Song Contest 1982 with Doce and the song "Bem bom".

Sports
In association football, for the first-tier league seasons, see 1981–82 Primeira Divisão and 1982–83 Primeira Divisão.
Establishment of the Portuguese Handball Super Cup

References

 
Portugal
Years of the 20th century in Portugal